Teliamura railway station (station code TLMR) is at Teliamura city in Khowai district in the Indian state of Tripura on the Lumding–Sabroom section.

Administration 
It is in the Lumding railway division of the Northeast Frontier Railway zone of the Indian Railways.

The railway line has single  broad gauge track from Lumding junction in Assam to Agartala in West Tripura district of Tripura.

History
Teliamura railway station became operation in 2008 with the metre-gauge line from Lumding to Agartala but later in 2016 entire section converted into broad-gauge line.

Platforms 
There are a total of 2 platforms and 3 tracks. The platforms are connected by foot overbridge. These platforms are built to accommodate 24 coaches express train.

Station layout

Track layout

Nearest airport
The nearest airports are Agartala Airport at Agartala, Silchar Airport at Silchar.

See also 

 Teliamura
 Lumding–Sabroom section
 Northeast Frontier Railway zone

References

External links 

 
  Ministry of Indian Railways, Official website

Lumding railway division
Railway stations opened in 2008
Transport in Tripura